The Academy of Notre Dame is a private, Catholic co-educational Pre-K through Grade 8 lower school and college preparatory upper school sponsored by the Sisters of Notre Dame de Namur.

Background

The Academy of Notre Dame was established in 1854 by the Sisters of Notre Dame de Namur in Lowell, Massachusetts.  The boarding school outgrew that location and moved to rural Tyngsboro, on land formerly belonging to actress Nance O'Neil, in 1927.  The school phased out boarding in the 1960s.

Student life
The Academy of Notre Dame is co-educational for students in grades pre-kindergarten through high school.

In high school, girls and boys are given the opportunity to be involved in extra-curricular activities. The school offers programs including liturgy committee, liturgical dance, Drama Guild, art programs, Glee Club, 1804 Society, Campus Ministry, soccer, volleyball, softball, basketball, Model UN, missions, recycling committee, newspaper, and many more.

The entire school wears crazy colors and designs during Spirit Week. There are special “no uniform” days where students can support missions run by the Sisters of Notre Dame, help raise money for Breast Cancer Awareness, help a family in need, bring in food, blanket and toy donations. 

The Academy also offers opportunities for international students.  Host families, usually families already a part of the Academy, help international students assimilate to their new life at the Academy and in America.

Notes and references

External links
 

Merrimack Valley Conference
Catholic secondary schools in Massachusetts
Schools in Middlesex County, Massachusetts
Educational institutions established in 1854
Girls' schools in Massachusetts
1854 establishments in Massachusetts